Plataraea is a genus of rove beetles.

References 

Aleocharinae genera